Nicky Souren (born 18 December 1999) is a Dutch professional footballer who plays as a midfielder for Eerste Divisie club MVV.

Club career

Roda JC Kerkrade
Souren was born in Rotterdam, but grew up in his mother's hometown of Eijsden after his parents divorced. After having played one season for local club VV Eijsden, he progressed through the Roda JC Kerkrade academy. In the second half of the 2017–18 Eredivisie season, he was included in the matchday squad of the first team on several occasions, but did not yet make his debut. He signed a contract with the club until 2020 on 21 March 2018. At the end of the season, Roda suffered relegation to the Eerste Divisie.

He made his Eerste Divisie debut for Roda on 14 October 2018, starting in a 3–0 away loss to Go Ahead Eagles. On 30 November 2018, Souren scored his first goal, volleying home in a 5–0 away win over TOP Oss.

Souren made a total of 60 appearances for Roda between 2017 and 2021, scoring twice.

MVV
On 25 August 2021, Souren signed a one-year contract with an option for an additional year with MVV, making the move alongside teammate Mart Remans. He made his debut for the club two days later, starting in a 5–0 away loss to Volendam. He impressed during his first season with MVV and grew into an key player in midfield, extending his contract with the club by another season on 29 April 2022.

Souren scored his first goal for MVV on 29 August 2022 in a 2–2 away draw against Heracles Almelo.

International career
Souren made his international debut on 13 March 2015 for the Netherlands under-16 team, starting in a 4–0 friendly win over Republic of Ireland. He gained three caps at under-16 level. In December 2015, he was called up for Netherlands under-17 friendlies but was ruled out due to injury. He made a total of five appearances for the Netherlands youth national sides.

Personal life
Souren is a Christian.

Career statistics

References

External links
 

1999 births
Footballers from Rotterdam
Living people
Dutch footballers
Netherlands youth international footballers
Roda JC Kerkrade players
MVV Maastricht players
Eerste Divisie players
Association football midfielders
Dutch Christians